Paul Eenhoorn (16 November 1948 – 1 August 2022) was an Australian actor working in Seattle, Washington, perhaps best known for his work in the 2013 film This Is Martin Bonner. Since moving to Seattle, he had quickly grown to be a well-respected actor in the film community there. His work has been seen at many film festivals around the world.

Eenhoorn played the villain, Mr. Daniels, in the family comedy Max Rules, which was voted by audiences as the top U.S. film at the 2004 SIFF. Also, the short film Elliot's Wake was an official selection of the 2007 SIFF. Paul received critical acclaim for leading the cast in the medieval epic Warrior's End, which was given the Mt. Rainier award at the 2009 STIFF. Eenhoorn was also seen at the 2009 STIFF in the short thriller Chemistry, which was awarded for Best On Screen Chemistry. Paul played the Lead Detective in the controversial film Zoo, which played at Sundance and Cannes. Paul may also be recognised by video gamers for modelling as the face for Half-Life 2s Arne Magnusson.

Eenhoorn died in his sleep in Tacoma, Washington, on 1 August 2022.

References

External links
 

1948 births
2022 deaths
Australian male actors
Australian emigrants to the United States